The First Street Tunnel is a two-track, soft-earth tunnel built between 1904 and 1906 by the Washington Terminal Company to serve as the southern approach to Union Station in Washington, D.C. Currently owned by Amtrak, it connects to lower-level tracks and platforms at the station, passes under Capitol Hill and connects to the RF&P Subdivision (CSX Transportation) and Long Bridge, offering through railway service to Alexandria, Virginia, and points west and south. Unlike the Northeast Corridor tracks north of Union Station, the tunnel tracks are not electrified, so southbound trains leaving Union Station must switch to diesel locomotives before entering the tunnel. Exiting Union Station, the tunnel runs due south under First Street NE and SE before curving to the southwest under a parking lot near the Capitol South Metro station. Its southern portal is just east of South Capitol Street at the intersection of D Street SE and New Jersey Avenue SE.

See also
Virginia Avenue Tunnel

References

External links 
 Heavy Rail Track and Structures in Washington DC BelowTheCapital.org
 Images of First Street Tunnel Construction (Archive)

Amtrak tunnels
Railroad tunnels in Washington, D.C.
Tunnels completed in 1906
1906 establishments in Washington, D.C.